Kenton is a town in Gibson and Obion counties, Tennessee. The population was 1,281 at the 2010 census, a decline of 25 from 2000. The Gibson County portion of Kenton is part of the Humboldt, TN Micropolitan Statistical Area, while the Obion County portion is part of the Union City, TN–KY Micropolitan Statistical Area.

Geography
Kenton is located at  (36.202027, -89.013044).

According to the United States Census Bureau, the town has a total area of 2.0 square miles (5.2 km2), of which 2.0 square miles (5.2 km2) is land and 0.04 square mile (0.1 km2) (1.00%) is water.

Demographics

2020 census

As of the 2020 United States census, there were 1,205 people, 540 households, and 354 families residing in the town.

2000 census
As of the census of 2000, there were 1,306 people, 567 households, and 378 families residing in the town. The racial makeup of the town was 84.76% White, 14.40% African American, 0.08% Native American, 0.08% Pacific Islander, 0.23% from other races, and 0.46% from two or more races. Hispanic or Latino of any race were 1.91% of the population.

There were 567 households, out of which 30.9% had children under the age of 18 living with them, 49.9% were married couples living together, 12.5% had a female householder with no husband present, and 33.3% were non-families. 30.9% of all households were made up of individuals, and 18.2% had someone living alone who was 65 years of age or older. The average household size was 2.30 and the average family size was 2.85.

In the town, the population was spread out, with 24.5% under the age of 18, 7.1% from 18 to 24, 27.8% from 25 to 44, 22.8% from 45 to 64, and 17.8% who were 65 years of age or older. The median age was 38 years. For every 100 females, there were 87.6 males. For every 100 females age 18 and over, there were 81.6 males.

The median income for a household in the town was $29,803, and the median income for a family was $37,788. Males had a median income of $27,037 versus $19,792 for females. The per capita income for the town was $16,515. About 11.9% of families and 14.6% of the population were below the poverty line, including 16.5% of those under age 18 and 19.7% of those age 65 or over.

Fauna

Kenton is one of four communities in the United States that has a large population of white squirrels. In 2006 the population was estimated at 200, or about one for every six residents.
The town celebrates this anomaly with its annual White Squirrel Festival held during the week in which the Fourth of July falls.

Notable people
Carl Bell, musician.
Rags Faircloth, baseball player.
Memphis Pal Moore, boxer.
Bill Sanderson, politician–State Representative 2010–2019

References

Towns in Gibson County, Tennessee
Towns in Obion County, Tennessee
Towns in Tennessee
Union City, Tennessee micropolitan area